Casa Grande is a neighborhood in Pasadena, California. It is bordered by Casa Grande Street, to the north, I-210 to the south, Allen Avenue to the west, and Altadena Drive to the east.

Landmarks
The central feature of the neighborhood is the palatial campus of Marshall Fundamental Secondary School, Pasadena's magnet high school.

Education
Casa Grande is served by Hamilton, Jefferson, Webster, and Field Elementary Schools, Wilson and Eliot Middle Schools, and Pasadena High School.

Transportation
The Metro Gold Line has a station on Allen Avenue near Foothill, at the edge of the neighborhood. The I-210 also runs through the southern part of the neighborhood. Casa Grande is served by Metro Local lines 256 and 686, as well as Pasadena Transit routes 10, 31, and 40.

Neighborhoods in Pasadena, California